Găleşti may refer to:
Găleşti, Străşeni, a commune in Străşeni district, Moldova
Gălești, Mureș, a commune in Mureș County, Romania